I Wanna Thank Me is the seventeenth studio album by American rapper Snoop Dogg. It was released on August 16, 2019 by Doggy Style Records and Empire Distribution. The album features guest appearances from Rick Rock, Chris Brown, Anitta, Jermaine Dupri, Stressmatic, YG, RJ, Mustard, Slim Jxmmi of Rae Sremmurd, Russ, Wiz Khalifa, DJ Battlecat, Lil Duval, Swizz Beatz, Ozuna, Slick Rick, Trey Songz and Snoop's cousin, the late Nate Dogg, among others. It was supported by an eponymous single, "I Wanna Thank Me", released on July 3.

Background
On March 27, 2019, Snoop Dogg announced through his Instagram account that he was releasing a new album in May. The album's release date was eventually postponed to August 16.

Cover art
The album cover references the 1903 painting A Friend in Need, part of the Dogs Playing Poker series by Cassius Marcellus Coolidge.

Reception

The album received generally positive reviews. Neil Z. Yeung of Allmusic stated, "There's not much here to hail a return-to-form renaissance, but for those in need of a solid dose of the familiar, I Wanna Thank Me is pure Snoop, complete with sly boasts, smooth production, and nostalgic, kush-loving comforts."

Commercial performance
 I Wanna Thank Me debuted at number 76 on the US Billboard 200 with 9,000 album-equivalent units, becoming his second lowest-charting album on the chart after his 2018 gospel album Bible of Love.

Track listing
Credits adapted from Tidal

Charts

References

2019 albums
Albums produced by DJ Green Lantern
Albums produced by DJ Mustard
Albums produced by Dunlap Exclusive
Albums produced by Fredwreck
Albums produced by Jazze Pha
Albums produced by Jermaine Dupri
Albums produced by Soopafly
Albums produced by Swizz Beatz
Snoop Dogg albums
Empire Distribution albums
Doggystyle Records albums